Two Actors in Samurai Roles from the series "Tales of Brave Warriors of Renown" is an ukiyo-e woodblock print diptych by Osaka-based late Edo period print designer  (fl. c. 1819-1863). Each sheet depicts a kabuki actor as a samurai, and belongs to a series of prints celebrating illustrious figures in Japan's martial tradition. The print belongs to the permanent collection of the Prince Takamado Gallery of Japanese Art in the Royal Ontario Museum, Canada.

Print details
 Medium:  woodblock print; ink and colour on paper
 Size: 
 Format: 2  single sheet prints creating a diptych 
 Genre: ,  actor print
 Japanese title: 「高名武勇伝」「宇治兵部の介」 & 「高名武勇伝」「金井たに五郎」 
 Exhibit title: Two Actors in Samurai Roles from the series "Tales of Brave Warriors of Renown"
 Date: 1847-1850
 Inscription: none
 Signature: 廣貞 [Hirosada] in white spaces among foliage on outside edge of either print  
 Publisher's mark: none visible  
 Censor seal: none
 Date seal: none
 Credit line: none

Image

Series
The prints are taken from the print series , which is translated as "Tales of Brave Warriors of Renown" or "Tales of Renowned Heroes." Hirosada produced multiple albums of this type including over one hundred heroic warrior images as single sheets and polytychs, including  ("Tales of Loyalty and Filial Devotion") also issued in 1848. Doesburg has argued that such print collections reflect an attempt to circumvent censorship of kabuki-themed ukiyo-e under the Tenpō Reforms by cloaking the dramatic content in titles that imply the promotion of moral values and "suggesting that the portraits were actually representations of famous men and women from history and legend." Although these images date from the period immediately after the easing of the Tenpō restrictions, they appear to be riding this trend.

Play
The scene in this diptych is taken from the play . The seventh act, commonly referred to as "Ageya", is still performed on a regular basis.

Made up of eleven acts, the play is part jidaimono historical drama and part sewamono contemporary drama. Frustrated by the increasingly strict regulations placed on the samurai, Yui and a small band of rōnin attempted to stage a coup against the ruling Tokugawa shogunate. The plot was discovered, Yui arrested and ultimately allowed to commit seppuku ritual suicide. The other section of the play tells the story of a revenge plot hatched by two long-lost sisters. Reunited in an Edo brothel, the two women plan to exact vengeance on the evil samurai who killed their farmer father.

The diptych is taken from a performance of the play which was staged in the eighth month of 1848 at Osaka's Kado Theatre.
 The print on the right is of the actor Ichikawa Ebizō as (also ), a fictionalized version of rebel leader Yui Shōsetsu.

Description
The diptych depicts two samurai facing each other in dramatic combative poses. They both wear waraji straw sandals, dark blue thigh-length kimono, and light blue obi tied casually around their waists. Both figures have chonmage topknots and carry two swords tucked into their obi. The figure on the left stands in an active pose with one foot off the ground. With his right hand he raises a sword over his head, and in his left he profers an ōgi folding fan with writing—possibly a poem—on it. The figure on the right wears a more elaborate kimono, which includes a haori jacket decorated with a flower kamon family crest on the sleeve and shoulder. He stands with his legs widely and firmly planted, about to grab his sword.

The scene takes place outdoors against the backdrop of pinetrees. Like the sky and ground which are grey with no detail, the trees appear simply as silhouettes. Among the trees in the background is the shadow of a building with a traditional thatched roof. On the ground between the two figures is a fire.

Subjects

Arashi Rikan III
Born in 1812, Rikan III began his stage career appearing with his father's travelling actor troupe. As a youth, however, he began studying kabuki under the head of the Arashi Rikan family, Rikan II. He performed very frequently on the Osaka, Edo and Kyoto stages. although especially praised for his tachiyaku (male heroes) and onnagata female roles, he has been described as "an outstanding kaneru yakusha," which is to say he was capable of performing a wide variety of both male and female roles. He was particularly praised for his powerful physique and voice, as well as his shamisen playing. Rikan III remained active on the stage until his death in 1863. He is buried on the grounds of Hōzenji Temple in the Dōtombori entertainment district of Osaka.

Ichikawa Ebizō V
Born in Edo in 1791, Ebizō was the son of a shibai jaya (theatre tea-house) owner and grandson of Ichikawa Danjūrō V, one of the biggest kabuki stars of his day. He first appeared on the stage in 1794 at the age of three, and went on to become an "outstanding tachiyaku [actor of male roles] and the most popular actor of the nineteenth century." He is described as "highly original", and as being particularly skilled at performing multiple roles within the same play and the requisite quick changes.

Ebizō V gained infamy in the summer of 1842 when he was found to be in violation of the restrictive sumptuary laws imposed through the Tempō Reforms. He was arrested and temporarily banished from Edo to Kamigata on the grounds that his ostentatious lifestyle was deemed to be irreconcilable with the Tokugawa bakufu's call for modesty and frugality. He was able to return seven years later, and had a very active career until his death in 1859. His sons continued his tradition, and both the Danjūrō and Ebizō lines continue to this day.

Medium and genre

Kamigata-e
Gaining prominence about a century after the emergence of ukiyo-e in Edo, kamigata-e were predominantly  (images of kabuki actors), and were produced almost exclusively by amateur “talented kabuki fans” promoting their favourite actors.

Kabuki-e
Literally 'kabuki pictures', kabuki-e began to be produced in Edo in the late seventeenth century. Further subgenres of yakusha-e include  bust portraits,  full-length portraits,  parody pictures, and  death portraits.

See also
 View of Tempōzan Park in Naniwa (Gochōtei Sadamasu) - kamigata-e print in same collection
 Actor Arashi Rikan II as Osome (Ryūsai Shigeharu) - kamigata-e print in same collection
 Bust portrait of Actor Kataoka Ichizō I (Gochōtei Sadamasu II) - kamigata-e print in same collection
 Ryūsai Shigeharu - kamigata-e artist
 Three Travellers before a Waterfall (Ryūsai Shigeharu) - kamigata-e print in same collection
 Actor Nakamura Shikan II as Satake Shinjuro (Shungyosai Hokusei) - kamigata-e print in same collection

Notes

External links

Related works

References
 

 

 

 

 

 
 

 

 

 

 

 

 

 

 

 

 

 
 

 

 

 

 

 

Works by Gosotei Hirosada
Kabuki